Lino Cason (born October 17, 1914 in Maserada sul Piave) was an Italian professional football player.

Honours
 Serie A champion: 1934/35.

1914 births
Year of death missing
Italian footballers
Serie A players
Juventus F.C. players
S.S.C. Bari players
U.S. Salernitana 1919 players
Association football midfielders
Vigevano Calcio players